Carabus vitalisi, is a species of ground beetle in the large genus Carabus.

References 

vitalisi
Insects described in 1918